Débora Bezerra de Menezes (born 18 May 1990) is a Brazilian para taekwondo practitioner. She won the silver medal in the women's +58 kg event at the 2020 Summer Paralympics in Tokyo, Japan.

In 2019, she won the silver medal in the women's +58 kg event at the Parapan American Games held in Lima, Peru.

References

Living people
1990 births
Place of birth missing (living people)
Brazilian female taekwondo practitioners
Medalists at the 2019 Parapan American Games
Paralympic taekwondo practitioners of Brazil
Taekwondo practitioners at the 2020 Summer Paralympics
Medalists at the 2020 Summer Paralympics
Paralympic silver medalists for Brazil
Paralympic medalists in taekwondo
21st-century Brazilian women